David James Baker is an American filmmaker.

Education
Baker holds a B.A. from the University of Denver, an M.A. from New Mexico Highlands University, and an M.F.A from New Mexico State University.

Career
Baker is the writer-director of Portraits of the Southwest, a documentary series produced by Public Television for Southern New Mexico and West Texas. Portraits of the Southwest profiles people and their environments in the American Southwest. The most recent episode, "Portraits of the Southwest - Road Closed," tells the story of a gay couple who tried for 10 years to open a hotel in Radium Springs, New Mexico.

Before he began producing documentaries for public television, Baker produced the documentary film In Their Own Words - A Return to Vietnam about a group of American Veterans and family members whose hearts and minds are connected to battlefields they visit and where they meet former enemy soldiers. Baker is a visiting professor at Western New Mexico University. His background includes stints at Disney and working in media technology at UCLA.

References
  Independent Film: IFP.org
 Desert Exposure: Radium Hot Springs
 Robert Nott. "Meaning and Remembrance." The Santa Fe New Mexican, May 28, 2004; p. 66
 Skyhorse Media
 Desert Exposure: July 2005 Events Guide
 Portraits of the Southwest Series Features Music of Steve Smith
 David James Baker in India for discussion with aspiring media professionals and designers

Living people
Year of birth missing (living people)
American film directors
University of Denver alumni
New Mexico State University alumni
New Mexico Highlands University alumni
Western New Mexico University faculty
Place of birth missing (living people)